Badgertown is an unincorporated community in Goshen Township, Belmont County, Ohio, northwest of Bethesda. It appeared on the 1888 H. C. Mead & Co. map of Goshen Township, although has since been mostly absorbed by Bethesda.

Badgertown is part of the Wheeling, WV-OH Metropolitan Statistical Area.

References

Unincorporated communities in Belmont County, Ohio
Unincorporated communities in Ohio